Nyíregyháza-Sóstóhegy is located 7 kilometres north of Nyíregyháza in Hungary. The district is in the suburban zone of Nyíregyháza and most of inhabitants works in the city. There are only family and detached houses. Only a rail line severs Sóstóhegy from its neighbour named Sóstógyógyfürdő which is a recreation area. This district is also part of Nyíregyháza where there are parks, restaurants, hotels, a salty lake, an open-air museum, a forest, a spa with several pools and a water park. The most well-known attraction is the local zoo.

Approach 
Sóstóhegy can be approached from many directions:
 On two roads: Korányi Frigyes and Sóstói-Kemecsei Road from Nyíregyháza
 On several streets from Nyíregyháza-Sóstógyógyfürdő
 From Nyírszőlős
 From Nyírtura
 On a well-maintained dirt road from Nyírpazony
 On the Kemecsei Road from Nagyhalász-Kótaj
 By train along the Nyíregyháza-Záhony line
 By bus (Number 14, 14F or several coaches)

Statistics 
KSH:
 Population: 4683
 Number of flats: 1475
 Uninhabited holiday homes: 83
 Other inhabited units: 3

Notes